NGC 527, also occasionally referred to as PGC 5128 or PGC 5141, is a lenticular galaxy located approximately 259 million light-years from the Solar System in the constellation Sculptor. It was discovered on 1 September 1834 by astronomer John Herschel.

Observation history 
Herschel discovered the object along with NGC 526.  The object was  later catalogued by John Louis Emil Dreyer in the New General Catalogue, where the galaxy was described as "faint, small, a little extended, brighter middle, the following (eastern) of 2" with the other one being NGC 526.

Description 
The galaxy has an apparent visual magnitude of 13.2 and can be classified as type SB0-a using the Hubble Sequence. The object's distance of roughly 260 million light-years from the Solar System can be estimated using its redshift and Hubble's law.

Companion galaxy PGC 5142
NGC 527 has a much dimmer magnitude 14 companion galaxy (PGC 5142). Although this galaxy is not an NGC object, it is sometimes referred to as NGC 527B. The galaxy has an apparent size of 1.6' × 0.3' and a recessional velocity of approximately 5880 km/s.

See also 
 List of NGC objects (1–1000)

References

External links 

 
 SEDS

Lenticular galaxies
Sculptor (constellation)
0527
5128
Astronomical objects discovered in 1834
Discoveries by John Herschel